Maniac is a 1980 American psychological slasher film directed by William Lustig and written by C. A. Rosenberg. It stars Joe Spinell as Frank Zito, an Italian-American serial killer residing in New York City who murders and scalps young women. Spinell was also co-writer of the film.

With a minuscule budget, many scenes in the film were shot guerrilla style. Originally considered an exploitation film, Maniac has since attained a cult following despite receiving polarized reviews. The film was remade in 2012 by director Franck Khalfoun and produced by Alexandre Aja, starring Elijah Wood in the lead role.

While not prosecuted for obscenity nor officially listed as a video nasty, Maniac was seized by various police forces across Greater Manchester and Lancashire during the video nasty panic, presumably based on the film's notorious reputation overseas.

Plot
Frank Zito was abused as a child by his prostitute mother, and as a result, becomes a serial killer who murders young women, scalps them and attaches their hair to mannequins. After he awakens from a nightmare about killing a couple on a beach, he dresses himself, revealing terrible scars on his torso, and leaves his apartment towards Manhattan into Times Square. When Frank is randomly invited inside a hotel by a prostitute, she kisses him before he abruptly strangles and scalps her. He returns home, dresses a mannequin with the dead prostitute's clothing and nails her scalp to its head.  Frank tells himself that beauty is a crime punishable by death.

Sometime later, he dresses again and takes a collection of weaponry with him, including a double-barrelled shotgun, before leaving. He drives around Brooklyn and the Queens area, where he finds a couple exiting a local disco and parking near the side of the Verrazano Bridge. When the boyfriend starts up the vehicle after his date sees Frank spying on them, Frank kills the couple with his shotgun and then adds the woman to his mannequin collection. After seeing his recent crime on television, he talks to himself and the mannequins as he sobs himself to sleep.

During the next day in Central Park, Frank follows a photographer named Anna after she takes a photo of him and a little girl riding a bicycle in the distance. At night, Frank sees a nurse leaving the Roosevelt Hospital, where he then stalks her inside the subway station and murders her with a bayonet before adding her to his mannequin collection. Days later, Frank heads to Anna's apartment and is invited inside by Anna after she recognizes him from the photo she took of him. Upon him asking her out to dinner, he later shows her a photo of his mother who died in a car crash years ago. A few days later, Frank is invited by Anna to a studio during a photography session, and she introduces one of her models Rita to him. After seeing the two talking and holding hands, he steals Rita's necklace and leaves. Later that same night, he arrives at Rita's apartment to give her the necklace, before then attacking her and tying her to the bed. Frank begins talking and addresses her as his mother and stabs her with a switchblade before scalping her for his collection.

One night, Frank takes Anna on a date and they stop by a cemetery to visit his mother's grave. While laying some flowers beside the headstone, Frank begins to mourn over one of his early victims and attacks Anna. He chases her around the cemetery, but she hits him in the arm with a shovel before fleeing. He hallucinates his decomposing mother attacking him from the grave. He runs back to his apartment, where he sees his mannequins suddenly coming alive. They mutilate Frank with his weapons before ultimately tearing off his head.

The next morning, two police officers break into Frank's apartment and see Frank lying dead on his bed, having committed suicide by stabbing himself. After the officers leave, Frank's eyes suddenly open.

Cast

Production

Director William Lustig, who previously had worked as a director of pornographic films, used profits from his 1977 film Hot Honey to make Maniac.

Principal photography began on October 21, 1979, and wrapped on January 18, 1980. Many scenes had to be filmed guerrilla-style because the production could not afford city permits, including the shotgun sequence, which was filmed in just an hour.

The infamous sequence where Frank murders the boyfriend (played by Tom Savini) was loosely inspired by the "Son of Sam" murders committed by serial killer David Berkowitz, who shot people in parked cars with a .44 Special revolver. Savini, who served as the film's make-up artist, received the role for the male victim from him having already made a cast of his own head, which was filled inside with leftover food and fake blood. Since Savini used live ammunition for the scene, he immediately threw the shotgun into the trunk of a waiting car driven by an assistant Luke Walter, who was a friend of Spinell, to avoid being caught by the police.

Maniac was one of the three films that Spinell and co-star Caroline Munro worked together; the other films being Starcrash and later The Last Horror Film.

Release
According to Variety report, Maniac was scheduled for a midnight screening at the Cannes Film Festival on May 10, 1980. The film had its U.S. premiere in New York City on January 30, 1981, followed by a Los Angeles premiere on March 6.

Censorship
Since the film was not submitted to the MPAA, the film was released unrated, with the designation "For adults only". Despite the poster stating "No one under 17 will be admitted", a severely-edited version of the film received an R-Rating in the South and was distributed in March 1981 in several other States such as California, of the unrated version shortly after its first U.S. domestic release in New York in January 1981.

The film was refused a classification by the British Board of Film Classification upon its original cinema release and was additionally banned for video in 1998, but was later passed at an 18 certificate in 2002 with 58 seconds of cuts. Passed uncut by the BBFC for 2022 release from 88 Films.

In Australia, the film's promotional campaign featured a censored version of the theatrical poster image, which blacked out the scalp held in the killer's hand.

Home media
The film was originally released on Beta and VHS by Media Home Entertainment in 1981.

The film was released on DVD and VHS in North America by Anchor Bay Entertainment in 2001. Blue Underground re-released Maniac on Blu-ray on October 26, 2010.

Critical reception

Contemporaneous
Upon its theatrical release, Maniac received numerous unfavorable reviews, with many critics lambasting the film for its depiction of violence. Gene Siskel did a TV piece for the CBS affiliate in New York City where he strongly criticized the use of TV kiosks that showed graphically violent and gory scenes from the film outside a theatre in Times Square; he later picked the movie as one of his "Dogs of the Week" on his show with Roger Ebert, stating that he walked out of the movie after 20 minutes because he felt it could not redeem itself at that point.

Vincent Canby of The New York Times wrote: "Good sense, if not heaven, should protect anyone who thinks he likes horror films from wasting a price of admission on Maniac, a movie that shows how an aging, pot-bellied maniac slices up young women of no great intelligence".

Contemporary
On the review aggregator website Rotten Tomatoes, Maniac holds a 40% approval rating based on 20 critic reviews, with an average rating of 5.2/10.

Stuart Galbraith IV (DVD Talk) said of the film: "Despite some good direction and a sincere, even daring performance by character actor Joe Spinell (Rocky), who also co-produced and co-wrote its screenplay, Maniac (1980) is alternately repellent and boring, despite the obvious intelligence that went into its making. A low-budget slasher film notable for its extremely graphic splatter effects by Tom Savini - who also appears in the picture - Maniac is mostly a character study, anticipating the much superior (if no less unpleasant) Henry: Portrait of a Serial Killer (1986)".

Tom Becker of DVD Verdict said "that the film is so effective is due in no small part to the performance of Joe Spinell as Frank, the schlubby-looking guy whose darkness overwhelms him. This is not the standard, amateurish, paint-by-numbers horror villain turn. Spinell creates a fully formed portrait of this monster that goes far beyond the surface. He mutters to himself, talks to mannequins, growls like an animal when stalking his prey—yet he can be charming as well, and while the pairing of Spinell and Munro as lovers has a definite Beauty and the Beast quality to it, it's not entirely unbelievable. Had Maniac been more of a mainstream film, Spinell might have been remembered as one of the great horror heavies".

The Hollywood Reporter cites the film as "something of a grubby touchstone among genre fans".

Film scholar John Kenneth Muir wrote that the film "positively oozes sleaze and despair, and that's a compliment...After watching Maniac, you'll want to take a deep breath, maybe even a shower, but you won't have wasted ninety minutes on something that has no meaning, no pulse, and no heart". Jim Harper, in his book Legacy of Blood: A Comprehensive Guide to Slasher Movies, praised Spinnell's performance, noting it as the "centerpiece" of the film.

Legacy
Maniac has been cited by some media outlets as one of the greatest slasher/horror films ever made. Esquire placed it at #18 in their list of "The 55 Scariest Movies of All Time". It was ranked at #44 in Paste magazine's "50 Best Slasher Movies of All Time".

The film is discussed, in contrast with Christo and Jeanne-Claude's artwork Surrounded Islands, in David Antin's poem what it means to be avant-garde.

Maniac 2: Mr. Robbie
A horror short promotional film was shot in 1986 by Joe Spinell and director Buddy Giovinazzo entitled Maniac 2: Mr. Robbie as a remake of the 1973 film The Psychopath, about a psychopathic children's television show host who murders abusive parents. The short was done to raise financing for a sequel to Maniac.

The short film was included with the 30th anniversary edition release of Maniac.

The feature-length version of the film was never shot after Spinell died in 1989.

Remake

Lustig planned a remake. During the 2009 edition of the New York Horror Film Festival, while receiving a Lifetime Achievement Award, Lustig announced that the deal for a remake has been sealed. During a Q&A session at the Sunshine Cinema in New York City in November 2010, Lustig announced that the remake rights had been acquired by a French production company with Alexandre Aja attached. He also stated that he would love to see Tom Sizemore take over the Frank Zito role, as he feels Sizemore is a lot like Spinell, and that he had recommended as much to the French production company.

Elijah Wood was cast as Frank Zito and the plan was to begin filming later in the year. Aja produced the film and Franck Khalfoun was signed on to direct the remake. America Olivo and Morgane Slemp were cast, alongside Nora Arnezeder and Genevieve Alexandra.

Arnezeder discussed of the remake using POV shots and Elijah Wood's character as half-angel/half-devil. Arnezeder described her role in the film as an artist who develops a friendship with Wood's character. She declined to reveal more, but hinted at a different take on the original. She said she was drawn to the concept of the film as a psychological horror, stating it would not be that interesting if the movie was just blood and screams. The film finished shooting in Los Angeles in December 2011 and was released in 2012.

Accolades
Maniac was nominated for a Saturn Award by the Academy of Science Fiction, Fantasy and Horror Films, USA, for Best Low-Budget Film in 1981.

References

Works cited

External links
 
 
 

1980 films
1980 horror films
1980s slasher films
1980 thriller films
American horror thriller films
American independent films
Obscenity controversies in film
American serial killer films
American slasher films
American splatter films
Films directed by William Lustig
Films set in New York City
Films shot in New York City
Mannequins in films
American psychological horror films
1980s psychological horror films
Films scored by Jay Chattaway
American exploitation films
Films originally rejected by the British Board of Film Classification
1980s English-language films
1980s American films